Sleeping dragon can refer to:

Sleeping dragon (manoeuver), a manoeuver employed by protesters. 
Mei long, a troodontid species whose name means "sleeping dragon" in Mandarin. 
Zhuge Liang, the Three Kingdoms-era military strategist also known as "the sleeping dragon".
The first novel in the fantasy series Guardians of the Flame by Joel Rosenberg
Broken Sword: The Sleeping Dragon, a 2003 adventure video game and the third game of the Broken Sword series